The Russia men's national 3x3 team is the 3x3 basketball team representing Russia in international men's competitions, organized and run by the Russian Basketball Federation. After the 2022 Russian invasion of Ukraine, FIBA banned Russian teams and officials from participating in FIBA 3x3 Basketball competitions.

Senior Competitions

Summer Olympics

Performance at World Championships

Performance at Europe Championships

Performance at European Games

See also 

 Russian Basketball Federation
 Russia national basketball team
 Russia women's national 3x3 team

References

External links 
Russian Basketball Federation website

Russia national basketball team
Men's national 3x3 basketball teams